Wilson Run is a stream in the U.S. state of Ohio. It is a tributary to the Little Muskingum River.

Wilson Run was named after Israel Wilson, a local hunter.

References

Rivers of Ohio
Rivers of Washington County, Ohio